Widow Mountain is a mountain located in the Big Valley Mountains of northwest Lassen County, California. It is around 8.7 km (5.4 mi) southeast of Day, California. 

Standing at  1,927 m (6,322 ft.), it is the highest point in the Big Valley Mountains.

See Also 

 Big Valley Mountains

References 

Mountains of California
Mountains of Lassen County, California